Coats Bend is a census-designated place in Etowah County, Alabama, United States. Its population was 1,394 as of the 2010 census.  A post office was established in 1878 and was in operation until 1903.

Demographics

References

Census-designated places in Etowah County, Alabama
Census-designated places in Alabama